Aynata is a village in Lebanon. It is located in the southern portion of the country.  A stronghold for Hezbollah, during the war with Israel in 2006, about 60% of the homes in the town were destroyed.

The terrain consists of plateaus of varying heights, with the Aynata itself located at an elevation of 740m.  Several valleys separate Aynata from the nearest villages.  Aynata has a moderate climate, cool summers and cold winters.

History

Yohanan Aharoni have suggested that Aynata was ancient En-hazor, and that it was also listed in the topographical lists of Thutmose III.

Aynata  was suggested to be Beth-Anath by van de Velde in 1854, also by W.M. Thomson in 1859, and later by Victor Guérin. The same view was held by historical geographer Georg Kampffmeyer (1892).

Foundations and columns of a ruined temple complex in the woods near the village were recorded by William McClure Thomson, who thought them to have once been called Kubrikha. He remarked that "the whole neighborhood is crowded with ancient but deserted sites."

Ottoman era
In 1596, it was named as a village, ‘’Aynata’’ in the Ottoman nahiya (subdistrict) of  Tibnin  under the liwa' (district) of Safad, with a population of 111 households and 22 bachelors, all Muslim. The villagers paid taxes on  agricultural products, such as wheat, barley, vineyards, fruit trees, goats and beehives, in addition to "occasional revenues" and a fixed sum; a total of 10,560 akçe.

In 1875, Victor Guérin found a village with 400 Metualis.

In 1881, the PEF's Survey of Western Palestine (SWP)  described it: "A village, built of stone, containing about 500 Metawileh. There is a Moslem school in the village; extensive vineyards and a few olives in the wady. Water supplied from birket and many cisterns.”

Modern era
Aynata is the family home of Mohammad Hussein Fadlallah.

During the 2006 Lebanon War, on July 19, an Israeli missile killed 4 civilians in the village. On July 24, Israel shelled two houses in the village; killing all inside both houses. One house had 4 Hezbollah fighters, the other house had 8 civilians, aged between 16 and 77.

Aaynata has a population of around 5,000 (dropping to 1,300 in the winter) and is 120 kilometers (74.568 mi) away from Beirut and sits 740 meters above sea level. The area borders Bent Jbayl, Aaitaroun, and Yaroun.  It was occupied by Israel and most residents emigrated to Beirut's southern suburbs. Israel pulled out of the area in 2000 and it has seen housing construction since that time. Tobacco and olives are grown in the area.

Hezbollah fatalities during 2006 Lebanon War

 Mousa Yousuf Khanafer*
 Amir Ibrahim Fadlallah
 Jamil Mahmoud an-Nimr
 Ali Muhammad as-Sayyid Ali
 Mahir Muhammad Sayf ad-Din
 Zayd Mahmoud Haydar*
 Muhammad Dheeb Khanafer
 Kazim Ali Khanafer
 Ammar Habib Qawsan
 Nazim Abdan-Nabi Nasrallah
 Marwan Husayn Samhat*
 Muhammad Hassan Samhat
 Hassan Ismail Mustafa
 Shakir Najib Ghanam

* The body of the fighter was captured by IDF and removed to Israel but was returned to Lebanon in the prisoner exchanges in 2007-08.

References

Bibliography

External links
Survey of Western Palestine, Map 4: IAA, Wikimedia commons 
Aaynata (Bent Jbeil), Localiban

Populated places in the Israeli security zone 1985–2000
Populated places in Bint Jbeil District
Shia Muslim communities in Lebanon